Park Myung-soo (born August 27, 1970) is a South Korean DJ, comedian, MC, singer, and songwriter who debuted on television in 1993, appearing on MBC. He co-hosted the top-rated comic variety programme Infinite Challenge and also hosted the Date at 2 o'clock radio show.  He has released several music singles, including "Prince of the Sea", which was covered by LPG in 2007.

Personal life

Marriage and children 
On April 8, 2008, Park Myung-soo married his long-time girlfriend, 31-year-old doctor Han Su-min. This was the first time a member of Infinite Challenge has married since the show's inception. Their first child, Park Min-seo, was born in August 2008.

As of December 2009, with the joint co-operation of its enterprise company, he began his tenure as a CEO of a business called "Mohani" (모하니), which sells wigs in shopping malls.

Mental health and bullying
He confessed that he has suffered from anxiety since he was young due to being bullied severely when he was in school, to the point of being considered a loser by the students who picked on him and to the point where he developed generalized anxiety as consequence.

Career

Infinite Challenge 
On Infinite Challenge, Park is "the second-in-command" (2인자), putting him below the host-in-chief Yoo Jae-suk, who is "the first-in-command" (1인자). This spawned a running gag in which he often jokes about overthrowing Yoo Jae-suk as leader and becoming "first-in-command" himself. He also called "Rice Insect" (벼멸구), a rival nickname for Yoo Jae-suk's famous "Grasshopper". He also claimed that his nickname should be "Big Star" (거성/巨星 Geoseong). He sometimes tries to make use of his seniority by lecturing the other members on various matters, such as becoming a star; however, they rarely take him seriously.

Another nickname is "Chicken CEO," in reference to the Kyochon chicken shop which he formerly operated. He is currently a Seoul metropolitan manager of Imsil Cheese Pizza restaurant.

In October 2007, Park acquired another nickname, "worthless elder brother" (하찮은 형) after co-host Noh Hong-chul referred to him as a "worthless person with a worthless body" (하찮은 박명수님, 하찮은 몸) in comparison to world-class Figure skater Kim Yuna. Another related nickname is "Father" (아버지) since he is the oldest among another Infinite Challenge members and due to his weak stamina and slowly balding forehead.

Park is famous for his "scolding" repertoire (호통개그), in which he angrily and aggressively scolds his colleagues for usually trivial matters. This led to another nickname, "the Son of Devil" (악마의 아들). A related nickname is "Old Devil" from the "Money Bag" special episode, after co-host Noh Hong-chul was nicknamed the "Young Devil". (The two had stolen a briefcase full of money from Jeong Hyeong-don and subsequently conspired to take it from each other). Another aspect of his character is his tendency to flub words and to misspeak when scolding, leading other members to take him even less seriously.

His character in the show is also known for arguing and quarreling over petty issues with co-host Jeong Jun-ha. Park's hot-tempered on-screen persona is highly opposite with Jeong Jun-ha's tactless, simple-minded character that occasionally made the former lose his patience. The unique relationship between Jeong and Park has become an occasional segment called "Ha & Soo". "Ha & Soo" also can be called "Peter & Jonathan" with Park as "Peter" and Jeong as "Jonathan". Another similar nickname is "Red Pepper" (고춧가루) after Jeong joked about him and Park as seasonings ("red pepper and black pepper") for Yoo Jae-suk that being central of the program ("main menu") during Infinite Challenge "Face-Off" special. The two have also won the "Best Couple" award at the 2011 MBC Entertainment Awards, making them the first male-male couple to have ever won the title.

Radio  
Park is also a recognised radio DJ, hosting various radio shows over the past decades. In 2016 and 2021, he received the Best Radio DJ award at the KBS Entertainment Awards for his Cool FM Park Myung-soo's Radio Show.

Music Career 
Being an avid fan of electronic music, Park, under the pseudonym "Bangbaedong Wildcat", composed a total of six songs in varied genres, including electronic, medium-tempo dance and mystic melodies. These were showcased by his fellow co-hosts of the program during the Infinite Challenge "Park Myung-soo's How About It" special. Upon the broadcast, his tracks appeared on the real-time music charts for Mnet, Bugs, Naver Music, and Melon, and even ousted out Girls' Generation's newly released "I Got a Boy" track from the first place on the chart for a period of time. Since January 2013, he has been listed as an official composer by the Korea Music Copyright Association (KOMCA) under his "Bangbaedong Wildcat" name.

Recognitions 
Park won his first Daesang, the award given to the entertainer of the year, at the 2012 MBC Entertainment Awards after 20 years of his career as an entertainer.

Television and Radio appearances

Current programmes

Former programmes

Radio programmes

Discography

Studio albums 
 Change (1999)
 Dr. Park (2000)
 Son of Wind (바람의 아들) (2002)
 Ta La La (탈랄라) (2005)

Singles

Ambassadorship 
 Ambassadors for Island Day (2022)

Awards

Other accolades

State honors

Listicles

Notes

References

External links 
 Official Fanpage 
 Official Homepage of Muhan Dojeon 
 Mohoney Company web page 

 

Infinite Challenge members
South Korean television presenters
South Korean male television actors
South Korean radio presenters
South Korean comedians
South Korean LGBT rights activists
People from Gunsan
1970 births
Living people
Best Variety Performer Male Paeksang Arts Award (television) winners